Klubi Futbollitik Gramshi is an Albanian football club based in Gramsh. Their home ground is the Mislim Koçi Stadium.

History
Following a 5–1 win over Gramozi on 10 May 2015, the club was promoted back to the Kategoria e Parë but they later rejected the promotion.

Current squad

 (Captain)

References

Gramshi
Gramsh, Elbasan
1965 establishments in Albania
Association football clubs established in 1965
Kategoria e Dytë clubs